Jaroslav Čejka  (22 July 1936 – 11 October 2022) was a Czech dancer, mime, comedian and actor.

Life and career 
Born in Ostrava, Čejka began his career as a dancer at 17 years old, and starting from the 1960s he was a member of the National Theatre Ballet. He later became popular thanks to television, performing as a mime in comical sketches; his best known performance was the imitation of the hen, that he performed for the first time in a 1977 New Year's Eve TV special. He was also active as a comedy film actor, starring in about two dozen films.

In 2007 Čejka received a Thalia Award for his career. In his later years he lived in a retirement home. Affected by Parkinson's and Alzheimer's diseases, he died on 11 October 2022, at the age of 86.

References

External links
 

1936 births
2022 deaths 
Czech male dancers
Czech mimes
Czech film actors
Czech television actors
Czech comedians
Recipients of the Thalia Award
Actors from Ostrava
20th-century Czech male actors
21st-century Czech male actors
20th-century comedians
21st-century comedians